Behan is a locality in Alberta, Canada.

Behan took its name from a lake of the same name, which in turn has the name of the cook of a party of government surveyors.

References 

Localities in Lac La Biche County